The Piaggio P.149 is a 1950s Italian utility and liaison aircraft designed and built by Piaggio. The aircraft was built under licence by Focke-Wulf in West Germany as the FWP.149D.

Development
The P.149 was developed as a four-seat touring variant of the earlier P.148. The P.149 is an all-metal, low-wing cantilever monoplane with a retractable tricycle landing gear with room for four or five occupants. The prototype first flew on 19 June 1953.

Only a few were sold, until the German Air Force selected the aircraft for a training and utility role. Piaggio delivered 72 aircraft to Germany, and another 190 were built in Germany by Focke-Wulf as the FWP.149D.

Operational history
The aircraft was operated by the German Air Force between 1957 and 1990.

Swissair's Flying School based at Bern (Belp) airfield used a small fleet of the type to provide primary instruction to trainee pilots.

Operators

German Air Force
Marineflieger

Israeli Air Force         

Italian Air Force operated two Piaggio P.149Ds from 1953 until 1955

Nigerian Air Force operated 12 Piaggo P.149D in 1967

Swissair Flying School

Tanzanian Air Force

Ugandan Air Force

Specifications (P.149D)

See also

Citations

References
 Donald, David. The Encyclopedia of World Aircraft. Leicester, UK: Blitz Editions, 1997. .
 Gandet, Erich. "'Wulf' in Sheep's Clothing: Farewell to Swissair's P.149s". Air Enthusiast. No. 92. March/April 2001. pp. 42–43. .
 The Illustrated Encyclopedia of Aircraft (Part Work 1982-1985), 1985, Orbis Publishing, Page 2714.
 Wheeler, Barry C. "World's Air Forces 1980". Flight International, 4 October 1980. pp. 1323–1378.

External links

 Stevens, James Hay. "Fully Aerobatic Four-Seater". Flight, 18 July 1958, p. 73.

P.149
1950s Italian military trainer aircraft
1950s Italian military utility aircraft
Aircraft first flown in 1953
Focke-Wulf aircraft
Single-engined tractor aircraft
Low-wing aircraft